Leonid Yuryevich Rodionov (born 12 January 1993) is a former Russian football midfielder.

Club career
He made his debut in the Russian Football National League for FC Shinnik Yaroslavl on 12 March 2013 in a game against FC Salyut Belgorod.

References

External links
 
 
 

1993 births
Footballers from Moscow
Living people
Russian footballers
Russia youth international footballers
Association football midfielders
PFC CSKA Moscow players
FC Shinnik Yaroslavl players
FC Oryol players